William Reynolds (22 July 1879 – 1973), sometimes called Billy Reynolds, was an English professional footballer who played as a forward in the Football League for Burton United and Grimsby Town.

Career 
Reynolds began his career with Manchester City, but never appeared for the first team and later played for a number of Football League and Southern League clubs. He later managed AFC Amsterdam.

Career statistics

Personal life 
Outside football, Reyolds was a schoolmaster. His younger brother Jack was also a footballer and manager.

References

1879 births
Association football forwards
Manchester City F.C. players
Burton United F.C. players
Leyton Orient F.C. players
Grimsby Town F.C. players
Swindon Town F.C. players
Croydon Common F.C. players
English Football League players
Southern Football League players
1973 deaths
Sportspeople from County Tyrone
Maidstone United F.C. (1897) players
English footballers
FC St. Gallen players
Swiss Super League players
English expatriate footballers
English expatriate football managers
English expatriates in the Netherlands
English expatriate sportspeople in Switzerland
Expatriate footballers in Switzerland
Expatriate football managers in the Netherlands
British educators
Amsterdamsche FC managers